Ikke may refer to:

 Ikke Bødlen, poem by Halfdan Rasmussen

 Ikke Pe Ikka, 1994 film directed by Raj N. Sippy